Gislaved Municipality (Gislaveds kommun) is a municipality in Jönköping County in southern Sweden, with its seat located in the town Gislaved.

The municipality was created in 1974, when Gislaved locality where amalgamated with the surrounding rural municipalities to form an entity of unitary type. There are seventeen original units making up the present municipality. Within Sweden, and as part of Gnosjö region, it's regarded as being both cultural and industrially dominated.

History
The municipality has been inhabited for a long time, but without any significant urban areas. At the turn of the 19th century it contained some 700 inhabitants. By 1949 it was eligible to receive rights as a köping, comparable to town rights. A coat of arms was designed for the occasion, traditionally used by the cities of Sweden. When the municipal reform was carried out in the 1970s, Gislaved adapted the still unused coat of arms as the municipal arms. The arms depict the insignia for a historical hostel nearby.

There are 19 churches in the municipality, the oldest from 1350. In the small town of Burseryd is a church bell that is even older. Its inscription was made with the Futhark alphabet and reads in translation "The year Anno Domine 1238 was this bell made. Bero wrote the inscription". It is today the second oldest church bell in Sweden.

Geography
There are six nature reserves in the municipality. Rare plants and animals include the provincial flower the Twinflower (Linnaea borealis), the only flower named after the botanist Carl von Linné. Lake Bolmen lies in the south-east part of the municipality, with its main part in the Ljungby Municipality. It is the tenth largest lake in Sweden and offers fishing, canoeing and other nature activities.

Gislaved used to have a large tire factory under the same name as the town but it has shut down.

Localities
There are eight urban areas (also called a Tätort or locality) in Gislaved Municipality.

In the table the localities are listed according to the size of the population as of December 31, 2015. The municipal seat is in bold characters.

Politics

Municipal council

Mayors

List of Mayors

Timeline

Gislaved Municipality has for most of its history been governed by the centre-right parties, with the Centre Party heading the municipality from 1974 to 1991 and again since 2018. The Moderate Party headed the municipality from 1991 to 1994 and from 2006 to 2014 while the Social Democrats did so from 1994 to 2006 and again from 2014 to 2018. The Social Democrats have been the largest party in the council since its founding in 1974.

Gislaved Municipality is currently governed by a minority coalition between the Centre Party, the Moderate Party, the Christian Democrats and the Liberal Party. The coalition is led by Carina Johansson from the Centre Party, who is also Mayor since 1 January 2019, and Lars-Ove Bengtsson from the Centre Party who is President of the City Council. Marie Johansson from the Social Democrats heads the opposition.

Notable people 

Locality within Gislaved Municipality in parentheses.

A
Olle Anderson (Gislaved)
Ann-Charlotte Alverfors, author (Reftele)

B
Darijan Bojanic, professional footballer (Gislaved)
Johan Büser, politician (Anderstorp)

D
Lars Danielsson, bassist, composer, and record producer (Smålandsstenar)

F
Samuel Fröler, actor (Reftele)

H
Oscar Hiljemark, professional footballer (Gislaved)
Simon Hjalmarsson, professional ice hockey player (Gislaved)

J
Bengt-Anders Johansson, politician (Smålandsstenar)

O
Annie Oliv, model (Gislaved)

R
Maria Rydqvist, cross-country skier (Smålandsstenar)
Johan Runesson, orienteering competitor (Smålandsstenar)

S
Henrik Skoog, distance runner (Smålandsstenar)
Johan August Skogsfors, industrialist and founder of Skogsfors Bruk (today ESBE AB) (Reftele)
Carl-Johan Seth, actor, director and author (Reftele)

T
Iréne Theorin, dramatic soprano opera singer (Broaryd)

W
Åsa Westlund, politician (Anderstorp)

Ö
Emma Örtlund, actress (Reftele)

Sights 
The Scandinavian Raceway, near Anderstorp, was built in 1968.

References 

Statistics Sweden

External links

Gislaved Municipality - Official site

Municipalities of Jönköping County